Linda Rising is an American author, lecturer, independent consultant. Rising is credited as having played a major role in having "moved the pattern approach from design into corporate change." She also contributed to the book 97 Things Every Software Architect Should Know, edited by Kevlin Henney and published by O´Reilly in 2009.

University education 
In 1964, Rising obtained a bachelor's degree in chemistry at the University of Kansas, in 1984 a Master of Science degree in computer science at Southern Illinois University and in 1987 a M. A. in mathematics at the Southwest Missouri State University. In 1992, Rising obtained her PhD degree in computer science from the Arizona State University, with her thesis entitled Information hiding metrics for modular programming languages relating to object-based design metrics.

Teaching 
Rising taught as instructor in mathematics and computer science at various universities throughout the midwest from 1977 to 1984 and worked as assistant professor from 1984 to 1987 at Indiana University – Purdue University Fort Wayne.

Industry, consulting and writing 
In industry, she worked in the areas of telecommunications, avionics, and tactical weapons systems.

Rising has extended the use of patterns, building upon the work of Christopher Alexander on a pattern language for architecture and the work of the Gang of Four on patterns for software development. She extended the use of patterns to the support of organisational change. Her work and lectures cover patterns, retrospectives, agile development approaches and the change process, topics on which she is an internationally known lecturer.

Since 2010, she is editor of the Insights series of the IEEE Software magazine.

Her book The Pattern Almanac 2000 provides a comprehensive inventory of patterns compiled from publications in patterns conferences and books prior to the year 2000. The patterns are listed by name and divided into categories, and for each pattern a rudimentary description as well as a reference to a book, journal or URL where the actual published pattern can be found is provided. The Pattern Almanac 2000 has been cited as reference on existing patterns and used as starting-point of further research. Rising's indexing of existing patterns is seen as "a significant start toward achieving the ultimate goal of a pattern database."

The study The scrum software development process for small teams by Rising and Norman S. Janoff is cited as first published study in which the scrum, a development process for small teams which includes a series of "sprints" which each last typically between one and four weeks, was tested in real-life projects. The study has been cited for showing "that nonhierarchical teams work more effectively through the complex iterations and time-consuming gestation of a software program" and that "they gain strength through shared successes and failures".

She is editor of the book Design Patterns in Communication Software, a compendium of patterns, which appeared 2001. Contributors to her book include experts from the patterns community such as James O. Coplien and Douglas C. Schmidt. She is author of  Fearless Change: Patterns for Introducing New Ideas, co-authored with Mary Lynn Manns and published 2004.

Rising has been  keynote  speaker at the agile 2007 conference (topic: "Are agilists the bonobos of software development?"), the OOP 2009 conference (topic: "Who Do You Trust?"), the Agile testing days Berlin 2010 (topic: "Deception and Estimation: How we fool ourselves"), at the GOTO Amsterdam 2014 conference (topic: "Science or Stories?"), and at the European Testing Conference 2016 in Bukarest (topic: "The Agile Mindset") 

Her work has inspired many in the agile community, for instance Steve Adolph and Paul Bramble, who, together with Alistair Cockburn and Andy Pols, expanded further on Rising's use patterns.

Rising lives in Phoenix, Arizona.

Books
 Mary Lynn Manns, Linda Rising: Fearless Change: Patterns for Introducing New Ideas, Addison-Wesley, 2004,  - cited ca. 60 times
 Linda Rising (Editor), Douglas C. Schmidt (Foreword): Design Patterns in Communication Software, Cambridge University Press, 2001,  - abstract - cited ca. 50 times
 Linda Rising: The Pattern Almanac 2000, Addison Wesley, 2000,  - cited ca. 30 times
 Linda Rising: The Patterns Handbook: Techniques, Strategies, and Applications, SIGS Reference Library, Cambridge University Press, 1998, 
 Linda Rising: Patterns Handbook: Best Practices, Cambridge University Press, 1997,  - cited ca. 25 times
 Linda Sue Rising: Information hiding metrics for modular programming languages, Doctoral Dissertation, Arizona State University, 1992

References

External links 
 Homepage
 Linda Rising, speaker at QCon
 Linda Rising, author overview at InfoQ
 Interview on Coding By Numbers Podcast

Arizona State University alumni
American technology writers
University of Kansas alumni
Missouri State University alumni
American chief operating officers
Women corporate executives
American women business executives
American business executives
Southern Illinois University alumni
Indiana University – Purdue University Fort Wayne faculty
20th-century births
Living people
Year of birth missing (living people)
American women academics
21st-century American women